The tram-train de l'ouest lyonnais (in English, Western Lyon tram-train) is transport project in the urban area of Lyon in the region Rhône-Alpes to improve the traffic between the railway stations of Lyon-Saint-Paul to Brignais, L'Arbresle, Sain-Bel, and Lozanne.  The project consists of the creation of three tram-train lines.

Some rail lines have been doubled, platforms rebuilt, and stations modernised. The total cost of the project is around €150·2m.

The line from Saint-Paul to Sain-Bel started running on 24 September 2012.

See also
 Nantes tram-train
 Tramways in Lyon
 Transport in Rhône-Alpes

References

5th arrondissement of Lyon
Rapid transit in Lyon